Guava Jam: Contemporary Hawaiian Folk Music is a record by The Sunday Manoa, of Hawaiian folk music, released in 1969, advancing the Second Hawaiian Renaissance in the 1970s. The Sunday Manoa consisted of Peter Moon and the brothers Robert and Roland Cazimero.

Track listing
"Kawika" (a mele inoa) - (4:55)
"Only You" (Paul Meheula) - (3:51)
"Heha Wai'pi'o" - (3:05)
"Kaulana 'O Waimanalo" (Sam Naeole) - (2:54)
"Ka'ililauokekoa" (Henry Waiau) - (3:10)
"Mehameha" (Rick Bibbs, Peter Moon; English translation by Alice Namakelua) - (2:52)
"He Hawai'i Au" (Ron Rosha, Peter Moon; English translation by Alice Namakelua)- (3:45)
"Maika'i Ka Makani O Kohala" (W.J. Sheldon) - (3:40)
"Ka La'i 'Opua" - (2:25)
"Poli Pumehana" (J. Kaahiki) - (2:43)
"Guava Jam" - (2:15)

Personnel
Peter Moon - pahu, kālaau, ukulele, tiple, vocals, slack-key guitar, requinta (a small, antique guitar design of Spanish origin)
Robert Cazimero - ulīulī, ipu, bass guitar, vocals, ukulele
Roland Cazimero - guitar, iliili, 12 string guitar, vocals, bass guitar
Don McDiarmid Jr. - producer (son of Hawaiian musician Don McDiarmid Sr.)
Ron Rosha - narration on "Maika'i Ka Makani O Kohala"

Liner notes
Comments by Moon for the track "Guava Jam": "The Sunday Manoa breathes new life into the music of the past, enhancing the flavor of old with the influences of today. Guava Jam means that true Hawaiian music is definitely a local product, and is disciplined and rich with feeling as any other folk music."

References

1969 albums
Hawaiian music